The 2015–16 Metal Ligaen season was the 59th season of ice hockey in Denmark. Ten teams participated in the league. Esbjerg Energy won championship by defeating Herning Blue Fox four games to two in the finals. The regular season begun on 18 September 2015 and ended on 29 February 2016.

Teams 

It was attended by teams of the previous year.

Source: Eliteprospects.com

Regular season

Results

Updated to match(es) played on 29 February 2016. Source: Metal Ligaen

Playoffs
.

g.The score for third place is goals, not games.

Quarterfinals

Semifinals

Third Place

Finals 

Updated to match(es) played on 19 April 2016. Source: Metal Ligaen

References

External links
 Metal Ligaen official website

Dan
2015 in Danish sport
2016 in Danish sport
Seasons in Superisligaen